Philip Ernest, Count of Hohenlohe-Langenburg (11 August 1584 in Langenburg – 29 January 1628 in Weikersheim), was Count of Hohenlohe-Langenburg and was the fourth son of Wolfgang, Count of Hohenlohe-Weikersheim (1546–1610), who later became regent of the county of Weikersheim and his wife Magdalena of Nassau-Dillenburg (1547–1643).

He served in the Dutch army until he inherited the Dutch  from his uncle, Philip of Hohenlohe-Neuenstein.  When his father died in 1610, he and his brothers George Frederick (1569–1647) and Kraft (1582–1641) divided the inheritance.  George Frederick received Weikersheim; Kraft received Neuenstein and Philip Ernest received the Lordship of Langenburg.  He immediately began the construction of Langenburg Castle.  He spent much of his time in the Netherlands, until he was relieved of his duties as a colonel by the States-General.

He died in 1628, at the age of 44, in Weikersheim, of a "stone disease".  He was buried, together with his wife, in the crypt of the church in Langenburg.  A stone monument commemorating the couple can be found behind the altar.

Marriage and issue 
On 15 January 1609, he married Countess Anna Maria of Solms-Sonnewalde (1585–1634), the daughter of Count Otto of Solms-Sonnewalde.  They had the following children:
 Wolfgang Otto (1611–1632)
 Philip Ernest (1612–1612)
 Louis Kraft (1613–1632)
 Philip Maurice (1614–1635)
 George Frederick (1615–1616)
 Anna Magdalena (1617–1671), married George Louis, Burgrave of Kirchberg, Count of Hachenbach (d. 1686)
 Dorothea (b. 1618)
 Joachim Albert (1619–1675), Count of Hohenlohe-Kirchberg
 Eva Christine (1621–1681), married Count Wolfgang of Hohenlohe-Waldenburg (1617–1658)
 Maria Juliana (1623–1695), married:
 John William, Arch-Cupbearer and Count of Limpurg (d. 1655)
 Francis, Arch-Cupbearer and Count of Limpurg (d. 1673)
 Henry Frederick (1625–1699), Count of Hohenlohe-Langenburg, married:
 in 1652 with Countess Eleonore Magdalene of Hohenlohe-Weikersheim (1635–1657)
 in 1658 with Countess Juliana Dorothea of Castell-Remlingen (1640–1706)

Counts of Hohenlohe
House of Hohenlohe
People from Langenburg
1584 births
1628 deaths
16th-century German people
17th-century German people